Yorbriele Ninoska Vásquez Álvarez (born August 25, 1992) is a Venezuelan model and beauty queen who won the titles of Miss Tourism Universe 2014 and Miss Earth Venezuela 2017. She represented Venezuela in Miss Earth 2017, making it to the Top 8 during the finals.

References

External links
Miss Earth Official Website
Miss Earth Venezuela Official Website

1992 births
Living people
Venezuelan beauty pageant winners
Miss Earth 2017 contestants
People from Barquisimeto